The Teahouse of the Ten Lotus Flowers (German: Das Teehaus zu den zehn Lotosblumen) is a 1919 German silent crime film (filmed in color) directed by Georg Jacoby and starring Ellen Richter, Victor Janson and Meinhart Maur.

The film's sets were designed by the art director Kurt Richter.

Cast
Ellen Richter as Mimosa Yotamo 
Hugo Falke as Dr. van Halsten 
Victor Janson as Carlos di Terono 
Meinhart Maur as Wissenschaftler Dr. Yotamo 
Karl Morvilius as Teehausbesitzer San-Hi 
Frida Richard as Mimosa's Dienerin Beep-Po

References

External links

Films of the Weimar Republic
German silent feature films
Films directed by Georg Jacoby
UFA GmbH films
German crime films
1919 crime films
Silent films in color
1910s German films
1910s German-language films